The Qinling or Qin Mountains, formerly known as the Nanshan ("Southern Mountains"), are a major east–west mountain range in southern Shaanxi Province, China. The mountains mark the divide between the drainage basins of the Yangtze and Yellow River systems, providing a natural boundary between North and South China and support a huge variety of plant and wildlife, some of which is found nowhere else on earth.

To the north is the densely populated Wei River valley, an ancient center of Chinese civilization. To the south is the Han River valley. To the west is the line of mountains along the northern edge of the Tibetan Plateau. To the east are the lower Funiu and Dabie Mountains, which rise out of the coastal plain.

The northern side of the range is prone to hot weather, however the physical barrier of the mountains mean that the land to the north has a semi-arid climate, with the lack of rich, fertile landscape that can not support a wealth of wildlife. The mountains also acted as a natural defense against nomadic invasions from the north, as only four passes cross the mountains.  In the late 1990s a railway tunnel and a spiral were completed, thereby easing travel across the range.

Three culturally significant peaks in the range are Mount Hua, Mount Li, and Mount Maiji.

Environment, flora and fauna 

The environment of the Qin Mountains is a deciduous forest ecoregion.

The Qin Mountains form the watershed between the Yellow River basin, which was historically home to deciduous broadleaf forests, and the Yangtze River basin, which has milder winters and more rainfall, and was historically home to warm temperate evergreen broadleaf forests. Therefore the Qin Mountains is commonly used as the line separating northern and southern China.

The low-elevation forests of the foothills are dominated by temperate deciduous trees like oaks (Quercus acutissima, Q. variabilis), elm (Ulmus spp.), common walnut (Juglans regia), maple (Acer spp.), ash (Fraxinus spp.) and Celtis spp. Evergreen species of these low-elevation forests include broadleaf chinquapins (Castanopsis sclerophylla), ring-cupped oaks (Quercus glauca) and conifers like Pinus massoniana.

At the middle elevations, conifers like Pinus armandii are mixed with broadleaf birch (Betula spp.) oak (Quercus spp.) and hornbeam (Carpinus spp.). From  elevation, these mid-elevation forests give way to a subalpine forests of fir (Abies fargesii, A. chensiensis), Cunninghamia, and birch (Betula spp.), with rhododendron (Rhododendron fastigiatum) abundant in the understory.

The region is home to a large number of rare plants, of which around 3,000 have so far been documented. Plant and tree species native to the region include Ginkgo, thought to be one of the oldest species of tree in the world, as well as Huashan or Armand pine (Pinus armandii), Huashan shen (Physochlaina infundibularis), Acer miaotaiense and Chinese fir. Timber harvesting reached a peak in the 18th century in the Qinling Mountains.

Home to the Qinling pandas, a sub-species of the giant panda, which are protected in the region with the help of the Changqing and Foping nature reserves, between 250 and 280 giant pandas live in the region, which is estimated to represent around a fifth of the entire wild giant panda population. The Qinling are also home many other species of wildlife, including birds like the crested ibis, Temminck's tragopan, golden eagle, blackthroat, and golden pheasant, as well as mammals like the golden takin, golden snub-nosed monkey, yellow-throated marten, Asiatic golden cat, Asiatic black bear, clouded leopard, and leopard

The Chinese giant salamander, at  the largest amphibian in the world, is critically endangered as it is collected for food and for use in traditional Chinese medicine. An environmental education programme is being undertaken to encourage sustainable management of wild populations of the Chinese giant salamander in the Qin Mountains, and captive breeding programmes have been set up.

Weapons of mass destruction 
According to the Nuclear Information Project, China "keeps most of its nuclear warheads at a central storage facility in the Qinling mountain range, though some are kept at smaller regional storage facilities."

See also 
 Gallery road
 Huaqing Pool
 Qinling Orogenic Belt
 Qinling panda

References

External links

Landforms of Shaanxi
Mountain ranges of China
Regions of China